Cooking Under Fire is a documentary-style series featuring 12 contestants in a traveling cooking competition in four cities in the United States. Judges were Ming Tsai, Michael Ruhlman and Todd English. The show was produced through WGBH.

The winner, Katie Hagan-Whelchel, was given a chef position at one of Todd English's New York City restaurants. The show aired for one season.

References

External links
Cooking Under Fire website

2000s American cooking television series
2005 American television series debuts
2005 American television series endings